Thyrgis tenuifascia is a moth in the subfamily Arctiinae. It was described by Hering in 1930. It is found in Colombia.

Subspecies
Thyrgis tenuifascia tenuifascia
Thyrgis tenuifascia daguana Hering, 1930

References

Moths described in 1930
Arctiinae